Mimetus is a genus of pirate spiders in the family Mimetidae. They are found worldwide.

Description
Members of this genus resemble the comb-footed spiders, Theridiidae, due to their globular abdomen. The upper side of this bears curved bristle-like hairs. A distinguishing mark of the genus is that the distance between the anterior edge of the carapace and the anterior medial eyes is about one-third to one-half of the distance between the anterior and posterior medial eyes. The length of the anterior legs is about 1.5-1.7 times that of the posterior pair.

Behaviour
Spiders in this genus are specialised spider killers. They spin no web but are slow moving, stalking or ambushing their prey. They sometimes invade the web of their potential victim, vibrating the silk to mislead the owner. An individual will attack a potential victim by biting one of its legs and injecting toxins. It then retreats and the prey spider quickly becomes paralysed. The attacker then advances and starts to feed, sucking out the body fluids of its victim.

Species
The World Spider Catalog lists these species:

 Mimetus aktius Chamberlin & Ivie, 1935 — USA
 Mimetus arushae Caporiacco, 1947 — Tanzania
 Mimetus banksi Chickering, 1947 — Panama
 Mimetus bifurcatus Reimoser, 1939 — Costa Rica
 Mimetus bigibbosus O. P.-Cambridge, 1894 — Mexico, Panama
 Mimetus bishopi Caporiacco, 1949 — Kenya
 Mimetus brasilianus Keyserling, 1886 — Brazil
 Mimetus caudatus Wang, 1990 — China
 Mimetus comorensis Schmidt & Krause, 1994 — Comoro Islands
 Mimetus cornutus Lawrence, 1947 — South Africa
 Mimetus crudelis O. P.-Cambridge, 1899 — Guatemala
 Mimetus debilispinis Mello-Leitão, 1943 — Brazil
 Mimetus dimissus Petrunkevitch, 1930 — Puerto Rico, Antigua
 Mimetus echinatus Wang, 1990 — China
 Mimetus epeiroides Emerton, 1882 — USA
 Mimetus fernandi Lessert, 1930 — Congo
 Mimetus haynesi Gertsch & Mulaik, 1940 — USA
 Mimetus hesperus Chamberlin, 1923 — USA
 Mimetus hieroglyphicus Mello-Leitão, 1929 — Brazil, Paraguay
 Mimetus hirsutus O. P.-Cambridge, 1899 — Mexico
 Mimetus hispaniolae Bryant, 1948 — Hispaniola
 Mimetus indicus Simon, 1906 — India
 Mimetus insidiator Thorell, 1899 — West Africa, São Tomé, Canary Islands
 Mimetus keyserlingi Mello-Leitão, 1929 — Peru, Brazil
 Mimetus labiatus Wang, 1990 — China
 Mimetus laevigatus (Keyserling, 1863) — Mediterranean to Central Asia
 Mimetus madacassus Emerit, 1996 — Madagascar
 Mimetus margaritifer Simon, 1901 — Malaysia
 Mimetus marjorieae Barrion & Litsinger, 1995 — Philippines
 Mimetus melanoleucus Mello-Leitão, 1929 — Brazil
 Mimetus monticola (Blackwall, 1870) — Sicily, Syria, Egypt
 Mimetus natalensis Lawrence, 1938 — South Africa
 Mimetus nelsoni Archer, 1950 — USA
 Mimetus notius Chamberlin, 1923 — USA
 Mimetus penicillatus Mello-Leitão, 1929 — Brazil
 Mimetus portoricensis Petrunkevitch, 1930 — Puerto Rico
 Mimetus puritanus Chamberlin, 1923 — USA
 Mimetus rapax O. P.-Cambridge, 1899 — Costa Rica, Panama
 Mimetus ridens Brignoli, 1975 — Philippines
 Mimetus rusticus Chickering, 1947 — Panama
 Mimetus ryukyus Yoshida, 1993 — Taiwan, Ryukyu Islands
 Mimetus saetosus Chickering, 1956 — Panama
 Mimetus sinicus Song & Zhu, 1993 — China
 Mimetus strinatii Brignoli, 1972 — Sri Lanka
 Mimetus syllepsicus Hentz, 1832 — USA, Mexico
 Mimetus syllepsicus molestus Chickering, 1937 — Mexico
 Mimetus testaceus Yaginuma, 1960 — China, Korea, Japan
 Mimetus tillandsiae Archer, 1941 — USA
 Mimetus triangularis (Keyserling, 1879) — Peru, Brazil
 Mimetus trituberculatus O. P.-Cambridge, 1899 — Panama
 Mimetus tuberculatus Liang & Wang, 1991 — China
 Mimetus variegatus Chickering, 1956 — Panama
 Mimetus verecundus Chickering, 1947 — Panama
 Mimetus vespillo Brignoli, 1980 — Sulawesi

References

Mimetidae
Araneomorphae genera
Spiders of Asia
Spiders of Africa
Spiders of North America
Spiders of South America